The 1890 California gubernatorial election was held on November 4, 1890, to elect the governor of California.

Results

References

1890
California
gubernatorial
November 1890 events